Day Planner was a late morning-early afternoon weather forecast program that aired on The Weather Channel Mondays through Fridays from 11 a.m.-2 p.m. ET.

Program history
Day Planner was added in 2003 as one of the last programs to be added to The Weather Channel's morning programming block. For all intents and purposes, its format was similar to Your Weather Today, but the primary focus for the show was towards Middle America and the West Coast. While the show originally aired from 9 a.m. to noon Eastern Time when it premiered, its schedule was shifted to 11 a.m.-2 p.m. ET; this time shifting had put Day Planner into the morning hours for the regions. In the event an ongoing significant weather event occurred (e.g., severe weather outbreak, winter storm, hurricane threatening the United States), Day Planner would be extended by an hour, preempting long-form programming during the 2-3 p.m. eastern timeslot.

On September 27, 2010, as part of TWC's major schedule change, Day Planner was expanded to 5pm (7pm in case of severe weather).

Another major shift occurred to Day Planner on March 26, 2012. Day Planner returned to the former timeslot 11am-2pm, with long-form programming replacing it from 2-4 p.m. ET, and an afternoon edition of Weather Center Live was added from 4-5 p.m. ET. Nick Walker and Vivian Brown, who had previously anchored Day Planner during the 2-5 p.m. ET timeslot, were moved up to this timeslot, replacing Heather Tesch and Carl Parker. Tesch moved to Weekend Now and the weekend afternoon edition of Weather Center Live, while Parker became the channel's storm specialist providing tropical weather updates during Day Planner and Weather Center Live as well as a fill-in host. In the event of extended coverage, Day Planner would finish at 3 p.m. ET.

After a ten-year run, the final broadcast of Day Planner aired on November 11, 2013, the day before the Weather Channel's 2013 relaunch. Day Planner was replaced with the new all-day Weather Center Live program beginning on November 12, 2013.

References

The Weather Channel original programming
2003 American television series debuts
2013 American television series endings